This is a list of wars involving the Union of South Africa and its successor, the Republic of South Africa.

See also
 1981 Seychelles coup d'état attempt

Notes

References

 
South Africa
Wars
Wars